"The full monty" (or "the full Monty") is a British slang phrase of uncertain origin. It means "everything which is necessary, appropriate or possible; 'the works. Similar North American phrases include "the whole kit and caboodle", "the whole nine yards", "the whole ball of wax", "the whole enchilada", "the whole shebang", or "[going] the whole hog".

The phrase was first identified in print by lexicographers of the Oxford English Dictionary in the 1980s. Anecdotal evidence exists for earlier usage; the phrase was also used as the name for some fish and chip shops in Manchester during the same period.

Hypothesised origins of the phrase include:

 Field Marshal Montgomery's preference for a large breakfast, even while on campaign.
 A full three-piece suit with waistcoat and a spare pair of trousers from the Leeds-based British tailoring company Montague Burton. When British forces were demobilised after the Second World War, they were issued with a "demob suit". The contract for supplying these suits was partly fulfilled by Montague Burton.
 Gamblers' jargon, meaning the entire kitty or pot, deriving from the card game called monte.

References

Further reading
 

Slang
English phrases